The 2016 European Darts Matchplay is the fourth of ten PDC European Tour events on the 2016 PDC Pro Tour. The tournament takes place at Inselparkhalle in Hamburg, Germany, between 13–15 May 2016. It featured a field of 48 players and £115,000 in prize money, with £25,000 going to the winner.

Michael van Gerwen was the defending champion, but he lost in the semi-finals to the winner of the tournament, James Wade, who defeated Dave Chisnall 6–5 in the final.

Prize money
The prize money of the European Tour events stays the same as last year.

Qualification and format
The top 16 players from the PDC ProTour Order of Merit on 4 March automatically qualified for the event and were seeded in the second round. The remaining 32 places went to players from three qualifying events - 20 from the UK Qualifier (held in Barnsley on 11 March), eight from the European Qualifier on 22 April and five from the Host Nation Qualifier on 12 May (it was originally four, but following the withdrawal of Phil Taylor, it was increased to five.)

The following players will take part in the tournament:

Top 16
  Michael van Gerwen (semi-finals)
  Peter Wright (semi-finals)
  Michael Smith (third round)
  James Wade (winner)
  Kim Huybrechts (second round)
  Dave Chisnall (runner-up)
  Ian White (second round)
  Adrian Lewis (third round)
  Jelle Klaasen (quarter-finals)
  Terry Jenkins (third round)
  Robert Thornton (second round)
  Benito van de Pas (quarter-finals)
  Gary Anderson (third round)
  Mensur Suljović (quarter-finals)
  Simon Whitlock (second round)
  Mervyn King (second round)

UK Qualifier
  Phil Taylor (withdrew)
  Richie Corner (first round)
  Darren Webster (second round)
  Josh Payne (first round)
  Jamie Robinson (first round)
  Daryl Gurney (third round)
  Alan Norris (second round)
  Ricky Williams (first round)
  John Henderson (third round)
  Mark Webster (first round)
  Jonny Clayton (second round)
  Jonathan Worsley (first round)
  Jamie Caven (third round)
  Joe Murnan (first round)
  Chris Dobey (second round)
  Andrew Gilding (first round)
  Darren Johnson (first round)
  Kevin Painter (first round)
  Joe Cullen (first round)
  Devon Petersen (first round)

European Qualifier
  Michel van der Horst (first round)
  Mike De Decker (second round)
  Vincent van der Voort (third round)
  Ron Meulenkamp (second round)
  Magnus Caris (second round)
  Rowby-John Rodriguez (second round)
  Cristo Reyes  (first round)
  Remco van Eijden (second round)

Host Nation Qualifier
  Max Hopp (quarter-finals)
  Andree Welge (first round)
  René Eidams (second round)
  Jyhan Artut (first round)
  Maik Langendorf (second round)

Draw

References

2016 PDC European Tour
2016 in German sport